Pino sulla Sponda del Lago Maggiore is a former municipality of Italy, now frazione of the municipality of Maccagno con Pino e Veddasca in the Province of Varese.

It held the status of comune until 2014 when it was merged with Maccagno and Veddasca to form the new municipality.

It lies about located about 110 km northwest of Milan and about 70 km northwest of Varese, on the border with Switzerland. 

Until its suppression, Pino sulla Sponda del Lago Maggiore held along with San Valentino in Abruzzo Citeriore, the record of Italian comune with the longest name (30 letters).

Demographic evolution

References

External links

 Pictures of Pino sulla Sponda del Lago Maggiore

Frazioni of the Province of Varese